Peter Drake Rocca (born July 27, 1957) is an American former competition swimmer, Olympic medalist, and former world record-holder.

Rocca broke onto the international swimming scene winning two gold medals in the men's backstroke events (100-meter backstroke, 4×100-meter medley relay) at the 1975 Pan American Games in Mexico City.  Peter participated at the 1976 Summer Olympics in Montreal, Quebec, where he claimed two silver medals in the men's backstroke events (100 and 200-meter), and a gold medal swimming in the preliminaries of the men's 4 x 100 Medley relay.  Rocca continued to swim after the Montreal Olympics—two years later he won the silver medal in the men's 100-meter backstroke event at the 1978 World Aquatics Championships in Berlin, Germany.  The next year, he again represented the United States at the 1979 Pan American Games in San Juan, Puerto Rico, winning the 200-meter backstroke.  In 1980, Rocca qualified for the Olympic team in both the 100-meter and 200-meter backstroke events and was elected team captain, only to have his culminating performances dashed by the United States-led boycott of the 1980 Summer Olympics in Moscow.

Rocca competed for the California Golden Bears swimming and diving team while attending the University of California, Berkeley.  He was one of the top backstrokers in the world from 1975 through 1980, and competed in the eras of Roland Matthes and John Naber, finishing second to Naber in both backstroke events at the 1976 Olympics and beating Mathes in the 100-meter.  In college competition, Rocca led a resurgence of the Golden Bears men's swim program, captaining and winning individual and the team titles his senior year in 1979.  Additionally, he won seven USS titles; five individual and two relays.

At the age of 27, and after three years out of the water, Rocca made an Olympic comeback effort in 1984.  At the 1984 U.S. Olympic Trials, he fell short of qualifying for the 1984 U.S. team, finishing fourth in the 200-meter and third in the 100-meter backstroke races.

See also

 List of Olympic medalists in swimming (men)
 List of World Aquatics Championships medalists in swimming (men)
 World record progression 4 × 100 metres medley relay

References
 

1957 births
Living people
American male backstroke swimmers
California Golden Bears men's swimmers
World record setters in swimming
Olympic silver medalists for the United States in swimming
Sportspeople from Oakland, California
Swimmers at the 1975 Pan American Games
Swimmers at the 1976 Summer Olympics
Swimmers at the 1979 Pan American Games
World Aquatics Championships medalists in swimming
Medalists at the 1976 Summer Olympics
Pan American Games gold medalists for the United States
Olympic gold medalists for the United States in swimming
Pan American Games medalists in swimming
Medalists at the 1975 Pan American Games
Medalists at the 1979 Pan American Games
20th-century American people
21st-century American people